Direct labor cost is a part of wage-bill or payroll that can be specifically and consistently assigned to or associated with the manufacture of a product, a particular work order, or provision of a service. Also, we can say it is the cost of the work done by those workers who actually make the product on the production line.

Determination of the direct labor cost
Planning the work to be performed.
Describing the job content of the work, by indicating the skill, knowledge, etc.
Matching the jobs with the employees.

Usage
The direct labor cost is part of the manufacturing cost.

Calculation of direct labor cost
In the direct labor cost we need to have the job time and wage we will pay it to the worker to calculate the direct labor cost as in this formulation:-

 

Depending on the context, there are various methods to calculate personnel costs, such as on an hourly or daily basis.

Wage
The wage is the payment rendered to the worker per hour as a compensation for the work done.

Calculating job time
The job time needs to be measured by one of the following ways:
 time study
 work sampling
 Predetermined motion time system

See also
 Freight rate
 Job costing
 Labor burden
 Wage
 Workforce productivity

References

Costs